The Dr. McAdams House was a historic house at Main and Searcy Streets in Pangburn, Arkansas.  It was a -story vernacular wood-frame structure, with a hip-over-gable roof, novelty siding, and a foundation of stone piers.  A porch extended across the front, supported by posts, with a projecting gable above its left side.  Built about 1910, it was one of the best-preserved houses of the period in White County.

The house was listed on the National Register of Historic Places in 1991.  It has been listed as destroyed in the Arkansas Historic Preservation Program database.

See also
National Register of Historic Places listings in White County, Arkansas

References

Houses on the National Register of Historic Places in Arkansas
Houses completed in 1910
Houses in White County, Arkansas
National Register of Historic Places in White County, Arkansas
1910 establishments in Arkansas